Gabriella Santarelli (born 2 March 1936) is an Italian former gymnast. She competed in six events at the 1960 Summer Olympics.

References

External links
 

1936 births
Living people
Italian female artistic gymnasts
Olympic gymnasts of Italy
Gymnasts at the 1960 Summer Olympics
People from Forlì
Sportspeople from the Province of Forlì-Cesena